2004–05 was the first season of the New Zealand Football Championship.

Team locations

Season summary
The league kicked off on 15 October 2004, with a 3–1 victory for Auckland City at Napier City Rovers and it soon became clear that Auckland City, along with Waitakere United, were the class teams in the championship. Auckland lost only three games all year en route to be the first winners of the New Zealand Football Championship. Even though they were runners-up in both the regular season and Grand Final, Waitakere lost four times to Auckland City, including the thrilling 3–2 final in front of 3,800 spectators at Auckland City's home field, Kiwitea Street, where Auckland came back from 2-1 down to win in the last minutes of the game.

Waikato FC came out best of the rest to take the final playoff position in third, despite making a slow start to the season. Notables among the other teams were Napier City Rovers, who also came back from a slow start to have a chance of making the playoffs in the final week of the season. Otago United won five games all year, but did not win any of their last twelve games.

League table

https://www.rsssf.org/tablesn/nz05.html

Finals
Waitakere and Waikato play in the Elimination Final, the winner of which plays Auckland in Grand Final.

Bracket

Elimination Final
6 March: Waitakere United 4 - 1 Waikato FC

Grand Final
12 March: Auckland City 3 - 2 Waitakere United

Oceania Club Championship
By winning the NZFC, Auckland City went on to represent New Zealand in the Oceania Club Championship in Tahiti. Auckland lost their first game to Australian representatives Sydney FC, 3–2 in the dying minutes. Their next game, against tournament hosts AS Pirae of Tahiti, was also a loss, this time by 1–0. Auckland City would take some consolation from finishing third in their group after defeating the champions of Papua New Guinea, Sobou FC, by 6–1.

See also
New Zealand Football Championship

New Zealand Football Championship seasons
1
New
New